Violet Hamilton Cliff (née Supple) (2 November 1916 – 23 March 2003) was a British pair skater who competed with her husband, Leslie Cliff.  The couple finished seventh at the 1936 Winter Olympics.  That same year, they won the silver medal at the European Figure Skating Championships and the bronze at the World Figure Skating Championships.  They won another bronze at the 1937 World Championships. She was born in Bath, Somerset, England.

Results
(with Cliff)

References

 Violet Cliff's profile at Sports Reference.com

1916 births
2003 deaths
British female pair skaters
English female pair skaters
Olympic figure skaters of Great Britain
Figure skaters at the 1936 Winter Olympics
World Figure Skating Championships medalists
European Figure Skating Championships medalists
Sportspeople from Bath, Somerset